Explosions in Ukraine during Russia's armed aggression against Ukraine (from 2014) are terrorist and sabotage acts that took place during Russia's armed aggression against Ukraine in the Ukrainian-controlled territory of Ukraine. The explosions were aimed at intimidating the population, obstructing the volunteer movement in Ukraine and disabling equipment and ammunition of the Armed Forces of Ukraine.

2014

Poltava 
On June 17, 2014, at about 2:20 p.m., the Lokhvytsia Regional Police Department received a report of an explosion on the Urengoy-Pomary-Uzhhorod gas pipeline. The explosion occurred about 1 km from the village of Iskivtsi, Lokhvytsia Raion. About 80% of Russian gas destined for Europe passed through Ukraine through this pipeline.

Odesa and Odesa Oblast
On the night of December 3, 2014, an explosion erupted on Malaya Arnautska Street in the Patriot store of Ukrainian symbols. The explosion destroyed the outer wall and smashed the windows of the store. At the time of the explosion, the owner of the store was in the room. There were no victims.

On December 10, a powerful explosion damaged the office of the Dalia Severin Volunteer Hundred, an organization that supplies food, medicine, and clothing to the Ukrainian military in Donbas.

On December 23, a car parked near the headquarters of one of the Euromaidan activists, the Public Security Council, was blown up on 36 Zhukovsky Street.

Kharkiv and Kharkiv Oblast
At about 2 a.m. on May 29, 2014, on the railway bridge near the Zeleny Kolodyaz station (near the village of Zeleny Kolodyaz, Chuhuiv Raion) on the Mokhnach-Zeleny Kolodyaz section in the Kharkiv Oblast, a rail blast was blown up. As a result of the explosion, the shock wave smashed windows in houses near the railway. The event was qualified as a terrorist act. The movement of trains on the damaged section was resumed at about 9 a.m.

On November 9, 2014, at 9:45 p.m., an explosion occurred on Rymarska Street in the Rocks Pub Wall cafe, injuring 11 people.

 According to the SBU, members of the Kharkiv Partisans terrorist group, which consists of a number of separate reconnaissance and sabotage groups without horizontal ties, are carrying out terrorist attacks in Kharkiv and the Kharkiv Oblast. Some of them are "canned", others are being trained. The core of the group consists of people of various social strata (entrepreneurs, former police officers, taxi drivers). As of November 2014, the SBU had identified about 70 terrorists. For subversive work, they were recruited by both members of the terrorist organization and the special services of the Russian Federation, which instruct, train, finance and arm the militants. The "guerrillas" carried out 20 successful sabotages. Law enforcement officers detained 14 suspects who committed a terrorist attack in the Kharkiv pub "Wall".

Donetsk Oblast 
On December 23, 2014 at 01.40 near Mariupol the railway bridge over the river Kalchyk on 1260 km of railway race near the settlement of Mukhine was blown up. As a result of the explosion, the bridge support was damaged. Trains to the area of ​​the railway station and the sea trade port have been temporarily suspended. The bombing of the bridge was described as a terrorist act.

2015

Odesa and Odesa Oblast 
On January 4, 2015, there was an explosion in the house 3 on Gymnasium Street where the "Coordination center of the help to fighters of anti-terrorist operation" in Donbass is located. Doors and windows in the organization's office were destroyed, and there were no casualties.

On the night of March 5, there was an explosion on Koblevskaya Street in the basement, where the Right Sector office was located. At the time of the explosion, there were no people in the office.

On March 12, at about 12:40 a.m., an explosion occurred at the Admiral Business Center on Admiral Avenue. The office of the Self Reliance party branch has been blown up. The blast damaged the office and the windows of neighboring rooms. There were no victims.

On March 22, at about 11:30 p.m., an explosion occurred on Geraneva Street in the Kyiv district of the city. The office of the public organization "Paradigm 12", the head of which Alevtina Korotka was collecting aid for fighters in the anti-terrorist operation, was located in the blown up building. Windows and several doors flew on the first and second floors of the building. There were no victims.

On June 12, there were two explosions that damaged billboards with patriotic advertisements. The first explosion took place at 2:12 on the corner of Velyka Arnautska and Staroportofrankivska. As a result, the billboard "Crimea is Ukraine" and the plastic canopy of the newspaper kiosk behind it were damaged. At 2:18 a.m., the second explosion damaged a billboard at the corner of Admiral Avenue and Krasnova Street, calling for the SBU to report manifestations of "domestic separatism."

On July 2, at about 2:30 a.m., a powerful explosion occurred near the "U Angelov" cafe at 38 Zhukovsky Street. The explosion blew up the front door and a sign of the institution, and damaged the main hall. There were no casualties. The owners of the cafe were noted for their active pro-Ukrainian position.

On August 3, at about 3:20 a.m., an explosion occurred near the entrance to the building of the former military enlistment office at 35 Kanatna Street, where the local self-defense headquarters is currently located. As a result of the explosion, the window of the guard room was broken and the gate overlooking the Kanatna was partially damaged.

On September 27, at 4:45 a.m., a powerful explosion took place near the fire door of the Odesa SBU department. Within a radius of a few blocks from the site of the explosion, an explosive wave knocked out windows in buildings. The power of the explosion was estimated at 8–10 kg in TNT equivalent. There were no victims. In mid-October, the demolitions were detained, including a lecturer at Odesa National Medical University. The connections of the detainees indicate the presence of a "Russian trace" in the crime.

On October 7, an explosion occurred near the military enlistment office in Belgorod-Dniester. An explosive device with a capacity of 200 grams of TNT equivalent detonated. There were no victims.

Zaporizhzhia Oblast 
On January 20, 2015, a railway bridge was blown up on the Rozivka-Komysh-Zorya section near the village of Kuznetsivka, Zaporizhzhia Oblast. At least 10 of the 30 freight cars have derailed.

Luhansk Oblast 
On January 21, 2015, a bridge across the Seversky Donets in the village of Luhansk was blown up in the Luhansk Oblast. According to Hennadiy Moskal, this was the only transport crossing through which car traffic was carried out from the Ukrainian-controlled village of Luhansk, which was occupied by the militants. As a result, one of the seven checkpoints for entry or exit of citizens from the ATO zone was closed: Shiroke — Stanytsia Luhanska. The bridge was under the control of militants who planted an explosive and detonated it. A funnel formed in the middle of the bridge, and although there was no collapse, bus and truck travel was not possible.

Kharkiv and Kharkiv Oblast 

An explosion occurred at a peaceful rally on Sunday afternoon, February 22, 2015. Two people died on the spot (Euromaidan activist Ihor Tolmachov and police lieutenant colonel Vadym Rybalchenko), Danilo Didik, a 15-year-old teenager, died in an ambulance the next day, Mykola Melnychuk, 18-year-old student of the Kharkiv Academy of Municipal Economy died a day later.

On October 6, 2015, a tanker exploded at the Kupyansk-Vuzlovy railway station.

Mykolaiv 
On August 22, 2015 at about 2:40 p.m. an explosion occurred in the office of volunteers, located in the building of the Youth Center at Mala Morska, 1, opposite the 2nd gymnasium. A window overlooking Admiralska Street was blown up. There were no victims.

Kherson 
On September 30, 2015, an explosion occurred near the building of the Office of the President of Ukraine in the Autonomous Republic of Crimea. The explosive was planted under the office door. No one was injured in the blast.

2016

Kyiv 
On July 20, 2016, at 7:45 a.m., a car with journalist Pavel Sheremet was blown up at the corner of Bohdan Khmelnytsky and Ivan Franko Streets, opposite McDonald's Restaurant.

2017

Donetsk Oblast
At 8:30 a.m., on March 31, 2017, a car with SBU Colonel Oleksandr Kharaberyush, deputy head of the SBU's counterintelligence department in the Donetsk Oblast, was blown up by a controlled mine in Mariupol.

Around 7 p.m., on June 27, 2017 on the street Sadovaya in the village An explosive device was detonated by an unidentified person in Illinovka, Kostiantynivskyi district. As a result, an Opel Vectra car carrying Security Service of Ukraine servicemen was destroyed. The blast killed Colonel Yuriy Vozny, an employee of the Counterintelligence Department, and two SBU officers and a civilian who suffered injuries of varying severity.

Kyiv 
On June 27, 2017, at the intersection of Solomyanska and Oleksiivska streets in Kyiv, a car with HUR MOU Colonel Maksym Shapoval, commander of the 10th Special Detachment Forces, was blown up.

On August 24, on the Independence Day of Ukraine, at about 4 p.m., unknown individuals threw an explosive device on Hrushevskoho Street, which exploded on the lawn. The blast injured three people. The victims were the wife and mother-in-law of the Hero of Ukraine, the commander of 79th Air Assault Brigade Valery Chibineev and his comrade, a demobilized officer of the same brigade. According to Chibineev, the fragments were made of aluminum. According to him, his relatives became victims by accident.

On October 2, 2017, the Minister of Internal Affairs Avakov announced the detention of members of the organized criminal group "Torpedoes". According to the Minister, there is evidence that the detainees were involved in a number of crimes, including the Hrushevsky bombing on August 24.

On August 24, at about 10 p.m., there was an explosion near the monument to anti-terrorist operation soldiers at the intersection of Kurbas Avenue and the Korolyov street. No one was injured.

On September 8, 2017, at about 7 p.m. a fighter of the volunteer Timur Mahauri died as a result of a car bombing in the area of Bessarabian Square on the street. Velyka Vasylkivska, 5. Another woman was injured.

On October 25, at about 10:05 p.m., an explosion occurred near a car on Adam Mickiewicz Street in the Solomianskyi district near the building of Espresso TV channel.

Odesa and Odesa Oblast

On the night of May 6, there was an explosion on the Kanatniy, 35 street, near the building of volunteer organizations and the local self-defense headquarters. The probable cause of the explosion was the detonation of an RGD-5 grenade. The explosion at this address was the second since 2015.

In the morning of July 24, a car VAZ 2101 was blown up on the Zhukovsky, 32 street (intersection with Alexander Avenue). The source of the explosion was a shellless explosive device with a capacity of about 600 grams of TNT equivalent. No one was killed or injured. In early October 2017, thanks to the concerted actions of law enforcement officers, the offenders were detained during the transition of the Maryinka checkpoint to the side of the temporarily uncontrolled territory of Ukraine. On January 11, 2018, the Prosecutor's Office of Odesa Oblast filed an indictment against a 24-year-old citizen suspected of terrorism, who arrived in Odesa from Donetsk together with another person.

Kharkiv and Kharkiv Oblast

On March 23, 2017, at 2:46 a.m., a series of explosions and a fire broke out at the ammunition depots of the 65th storage base in the city Balakliia. Military Prosecutor of Ukraine Anatolii Matios described the incident as a sabotage.

Vinnytsia Oblast

On September 26, 2017, a fire broke out in the strategic ammunition depots of the 48th Arsenal of the Armed Forces of Ukraine near Kalynivka. As a result of the fire, 32,000 to 40,000 tons of shells exploded.

2018 
On October 9, 2018, at 3:30 am, ammunition depots exploded near Ichnia.

2020

Zhytomyr Oblast
On August 31, 2020, according to the SBU press center, investigators from the Security Service of Ukraine in Zhytomyr Oblast launched a criminal investigation into the explosion of a railway track carrying a Barbara-Korosten freight train. The explosion occurred on the Sokoryky-Bekha  during the movement of a train transporting 64 cars with gasoline and diesel fuel from Belarus, as a result of which the rails were deformed and railway sleepers were damaged. There were no victims.

See also 
2014 Russian sabotage activities in Ukraine

References 

Explosions in Ukraine
Russo-Ukrainian War